Island Beach is a barrier spit located on the Jersey Shore of the Atlantic Ocean in Ocean County, New Jersey. Since the closing of Cranberry Inlet about 1812
(approximately at the boundary between Ortley Beach and Seaside Heights), it has been joined physically to Squan Beach, and is a major component of the Barnegat Peninsula.

Geography
Island Beach is a barrier peninsula that separates the Atlantic Ocean from Barnegat Bay. It joins Squan Beach at the north end, and terminates at Barnegat Inlet to the south.

It was described in 1834 as,
 
An 1878 description of Island Beach is as follows, viz,

Communities
Communities on the peninsula include Seaside Heights, Seaside Park and the Berkeley Township community of South Seaside Park. The former Borough of Island Beach, a sparsely populated municipality comprising the bulk of the peninsula, lasted from 1933 until July 6, 1965, when it was absorbed into Berkeley Township; the territory is now Island Beach State Park.

References

Landforms of Ocean County, New Jersey
Barrier islands of New Jersey
Peninsulas of New Jersey
Spits of the United States
Beaches of Ocean County, New Jersey
Beaches of New Jersey